Barry Oldridge (born 31 August 1950) is a New Zealand wrestler. He competed in the men's freestyle 57 kg at the 1976 Summer Olympics.

References

1950 births
Living people
New Zealand male sport wrestlers
Olympic wrestlers of New Zealand
Wrestlers at the 1976 Summer Olympics
People from Featherston, New Zealand
Wrestlers at the 1974 British Commonwealth Games
Wrestlers at the 1978 Commonwealth Games
Commonwealth Games competitors for New Zealand